Costin Ciucureanu (born 29 May 2000) is a Romanian professional footballer who plays as a right winger for Viitorul Ianca, on loan from Concordia Chiajna.

References

External links
 
 

2000 births
Living people
Romanian footballers
Romania youth international footballers
Association football midfielders
Liga I players
Liga II players
Liga III players
CS Mioveni players
CS Concordia Chiajna players
AFC Dacia Unirea Brăila players
Sportspeople from Brăila